The High Court of Justice of Castile and León, is the superior and appellate court of the Judiciary of Spain in the territory of the autonomous community of Castile and Leon, notwithstanding its original jurisdiction in some cases, and the jurisdiction of the Supreme court. Located in Burgos, the court is divided into the Civil, Criminal, Administrative and Labour (Social) chambers. The High Court is also tasked with the resolution of jurisdictional conflicts between the courts in Castile and León.

The court was established by article 26 of the Organic Law of the Judiciary of 1985.

The President of this court is appointed by the General Council of the Judiciary for a five year term. The president of the High Court of Justice of Castile and León is José Luis Concepción Rodríguez.

Courthouse 
In July 1871 an agreement was reached to erect a building to be the seat of the then-Territorial Court. It was designed by Castile and León architect David Ruiz Jareño. Construction did not start until 1878, and after some budget problems the building was completed on January 22, 1887.

During the renovation from 2007 to 2011 the courthouse was temporarily moved to the court buildings in the civic centre of San Juan. The renovations were completed In 2012.

It shares the building with the Provincial Court of Burgos and the Office of the Superior Prosecutor for Castile and León.

References

External links 
 
 

Judiciary of Spain
Government of Castile and León